The Berendries is an uphill street in Michelbeke, part of the municipality of Brakel, in the Belgian province of East Flanders. Its top is at 98 m altitude, making it the highest hill of the Zwalm region, just north of the Flemish Ardennes. The road has an asphalt surface and links the valley town of Michelbeke to the hilltop town of Sint-Maria-Oudenhove.

Cycling
The climb is best known from road bicycle racing, where it regularly features in the Flemish races in spring, most notably the Tour of Flanders. The Berendries is just under one kilometer and has an average gradient of 7% with its steepest point, 12.1%, coming in the middle of the climb.

The climb is also regularly included in Dwars door Vlaanderen, the Three Days of De Panne, the Eneco Tour and the Tour of Flanders for Women.

References

External links
 Berendries trajectory on Google Maps

Climbs in cycle racing in Belgium
Tour of Flanders
Mountains and hills of East Flanders